Leonard Lee Buschel is an American publisher, substance abuse counselor and author of HIGH: Confessions of a Cannabis Addict. He is the co-founder of  Writers in Treatment, which supports recovery and the arts, and executive director of REEL Recovery Film Festival, focusing on stories of addiction and recovery.

Early life and education 
Buschel grew up in the Logan community of Philadelphia, Pennsylvania.  He attended Philadelphia Community College and the Jack Kerouac School of Disembodied Poetics at Naropa University in Boulder, Colorado. He received a substance-abuse counseling certificate from Los Angeles City College in 2005.

Career 
In 2007, Buschel, with Robert Downey, Sr., co-founded Writers in Treatment, which assists individuals in the writing profession suffering from addictions to receive recommendations to reliable treatment facilities. Buschel also participates in addiction and recovery conferences.

In 2009, he organized the REEL Recovery Film Festival, which takes place each year in Los Angeles, Las Vegas, Denton, Texas, New York City, and Vancouver, British Columbia, Canada, with proceeds used to help send people to substance-abuse treatment. Celebrities each year attend their respective screenings at the REEL film festival, including Ben Stiller in 2009,

Buschel created the annual Experience, Strength and Hope Awards, held in Los Angeles since 2009 and dubbed the Recovery Oscars by The Fix online publication. In 2015 at the 6th annual awards event, Writers in Treatment honored actor Joe Pantoliano, a recovering alcohol, food and sex addict, known for his role on the HBO series The Sopranos. Other recipients have included Buzz Aldrin, Lou Gossett, Jr. Jr., Mackenzie Phillips, June Valez-Mitchell, Pat O'Brian, Carrie White, Duran-Duran's John Taylor, and Chris Kennedy Lawford.
Buschel is executive editor and publisher of the weekly Addiction/Recovery eBulletin founded on April 15, 2014 .

In 2020 due to the COVID-19 pandemic, Buschel with business partner, Ahbra Kaye, kept the REEL Recovery Film Festival going by moving to a virtual format. With over 80 films shown to an audience from around the world the festival has maintained an online presence into 2021.

In 2021 Buschel completed and published his memoir, HIGH: Confessions of A Cannabis Addict  about Buschel's journey from drug dealer to drug counselor.  Buschel's memoir also tells of his birth and early life in Philadelphia. Three weeks after he was born his father died suddenly.  Growing up fatherless played a large part in his formative and later years, possibly leading to a reliance on drugs.

Awards 
In 2016, Buschel was given the Link Award by In Recovery Magazine for promoting recovery "using film, panel discussions, and speakers to understand and encourage compassion for people living with addictive disorders."

He was named a recipient of the 2015 Acker Awards for Film Curation.
The California Legislature Assembly awarded Leonard Buschel their 2016 Certificate of Recognitipn with the following statement: On behalf of the State of California and the residents of the 46th Assembly District, it is my honor to thank you for your outstanding work in promoting recovery among filmmakers with the 8th Annual Reel Recovery Film Festival. Your dedication is an inspiration to us all and I wish you the best success on all your future endeavors.  Signed, Assemblymember Adrin Nazarian 46th Assembly District

Personal background 
Buschel is a former drug dealer who now has 27 years of clean and sober recovery from drugs and alcohol. As a young adult, Buschel pursued various entrepreneurial enterprises in his professional life, most of which allowed him world travel as a freelance photographer. He was chief executive editor and marketing director for Logan House publisher's 1996 "Algae to the Rescue! Everything you need to know about blue-green algae.”
Buschel is a 1994 alumnus of the Betty Ford Center. To help fellow writers from novelists to screenwriters and journalists obtain the help he once sought, Buschel told the Jewish Journal, he co-founded the Writers in Treatment organization!. He is the brother of journalist and producer,  Bruce Buschel.

References

External links 
 Writers in Treatment official site
 Addiction/Recovery eBulletin
REEL Recovery Film Festival

Living people
Year of birth missing (living people)
Writers from Philadelphia
Writers from Los Angeles
Nonprofit businesspeople
Naropa University alumni
Community College of Philadelphia alumni